Automeris illustris is a species of moth of the family Saturniidae first described by Francis Walker in 1855. It is found in South America, including Paraguay, Brazil and Argentina.

The larvae feed on a wide range of plants. In scientific tests over 50 plants from 28 families (including Fabaceae, Rutaceae, Meliaceae and Myrtaceae) where accepted as food.

External links
Information on rearing
Biology of Automeris illustris (Walker) (Lepidoptera, Saturniidae, Hemileucinae)

Hemileucinae
Moths described in 1855
Moths of South America